The World of Don Camillo   (in Italy Don Camillo) is a 1983 Italian comedy film directed, produced and starring Terence Hill, and is a remake of Le Petit Monde de Don Camillo (1952). Both were based on the novel Don Camillo by Italian author Giovannino Guareschi.

Plot 
In a small village in Lombardy, the parish priest Don Camillo repeatedly collides with the communist mayor Peppone. The two do not share anything in common and the slights are continuous, at some times coming to blows with one another. Don Camillo coaches the football team of young boys of the village, and the day of the final match is near. Peppone however, to make a joke in bad taste to the enemy, corrupts the referee. Don Camillo realizes it and fights again with him; so Don Camillo is exiled. But the citizens of the village do not agree, and so Peppone is forced to make up for betraying their confidence in the government.

Cast 
 Terence Hill: Don Camillo
 Colin Blakely: Peppone
 Mimsy Farmer: Jo Magro
 Lew Ayres:  Doc
 Cyril Cusack:  Bishop
 Sam Whipple: Gigio 
 Andy Luotto: Smilzo
 Allan Arbus: Jesus (voice)
 Joseph Ragno: Brusco
 Jennifer Hingel: Lilly
 Ross Hill: Magrino
 Franco Diogene: Binella 
 Roberto Boninsegna: Angels player
 Roberto Pruzzo: Devils player
 Luciano Spinosi: Devils player
 Carlo Ancelotti: Devils player

References

External links

1983 films
Italian comedy films
Italian satirical films
Italian political satire films
Italian remakes of French films
Films based on works by Giovannino Guareschi
1980s Italian-language films
English-language Italian films
1980s English-language films
Films scored by Pino Donaggio
Films directed by Terence Hill
1983 comedy films
Films critical of communism
1983 multilingual films
Italian multilingual films
1980s Italian films